Nodiscala is a taxonomic genus of small sea snails, marine gastropod mollusks in the family Epitoniidae,  the wentletraps.

This genus has become a synonym of Opalia H. Adams & A. Adams, 1853

Species
Species within the genus Nodiscala include:
 Nodiscala ahiparana (Powell, 1930): synonym of Opalia ahiparana (Powell, 1930)
 Nodiscala attenuata (Pease, 1861): synonym of Opalia bicarinata (G. B. Sowerby II, 1844)
 Nodiscala bicarinata (Sowerby II, 1844-a): synonym of Opalia bicarinata (G. B. Sowerby II, 1844)
 Nodiscala gracilis Masahito, Kuroda & Habe in Kuroda et al., 1971: synonym of Opalia bicarinata (G. B. Sowerby II, 1844)
 Nodiscala japonica Okutani, 1964: synonym of Opalia japonica (Okutani, 1964)
 Nodiscala matajiroi Kuroda, 1954: synonym of Opalia matajiroi (Kuroda, 1954)
 Nodiscala monovaricosa Kuroda & Habe in Habe, 1961-a: synonym of Opalia monovaricosa (Kuroda & Habe, 1961)
 Nodiscala mormulaeformis Masahito, Kuroda & Habe in Kuroda et al., 1971: synonym of Opalia mormulaeformis (Masahito, Kuroda & Habe, 1971)
 Nodiscala spongiosa (Carpenter, 1864) - spongy wentletrap : synonym of Opalia spongiosa Carpenter, 1864
 Nodiscala zelandica Finlay, 1930: synonym of Opalia zelandica (Finlay, 1930)

References

 
 Powell A. W. B., New Zealand Mollusca, William Collins Publishers Ltd, Auckland, New Zealand 1979 
 

Epitoniidae